The Minister of Information (Sar HaHasbara) is a post in the Israeli cabinet.

List of portfolio holders

References

External links
All Ministers in the Ministry of Information Knesset website

Government of Israel
Lists of government ministers of Israel
Information ministers